Similosodus venosus is a species of beetle in the family Cerambycidae. It was described by Francis Polkinghorne Pascoe in 1867, originally under the genus Sodus. It is known from Australia.

References

verticalis
Beetles described in 1867